The following is a list of Singaporean electoral divisions from 2015 to 2020 that served as constituencies that elected Members of Parliament (MPs) to the 13th Parliament of Singapore in the 2015 Singaporean general election.

In the elections held on 11 September 2015, there were a total of 2,462,926 voters, inclusive of overseas votes. As of 28 August 2017, the revised number of electorates were a total of 2,516,608 voters, inclusive of overseas votes.

Group Representation Constituencies

Single Member Constituencies

References 

2015
2015 Singaporean general election